Violator is a company, record label, marketing group, and multi-media entertainment conglomerate founded and operated by Chris Lighty and Mona Scott-Young until Lighty's death on August 30, 2012.

History
In 1989, Lighty partnered with manager Scott-Young to launch Violator management. The company specialized in managing the careers of hip hop and R&B performers and is also a record label. Included among Violator's past and present clients are Mariah Carey, Busta Rhymes, N.O.R.E., Q-Tip, Missy Elliott, Fantasia, Mýa, Diggy Simmons, Cormega, Mobb Deep, LL Cool J, Nas, JoJo Pellegrino, 50 Cent, Fat Joe, Uncle Murda, Frankie Cutlass and Da Franchise . Violator has released two compilation albums of material from its artists: Violator: The Album and Violator: The Album, V2.0. The first album features Q-Tip's first solo hit single, "Vivrant Thing". Lighty also managed Sean "Diddy" Combs.

In September 2009, CEO Chris Lighty joined the Advisory Board of Purista premium cocktail mixers to aid in the execution of the company's strategic marketing plans.

Chris Lighty died on August 30, 2012.

Violator Entertainment
This is the list of movies and video games that Violator Entertainment has worked on.
Music Manager Leon Derrick Youngblood SR collaborated with Dave Lighty to broker a deal for music producer/recording artist Roccstar, who is signed to Violator as a music producer and is currently working on several artist under the Violator umbrella, Chris Lighty signed off on the deal in 2011.
Full Clip (2004)
50 Cent: Bulletproof (video game, 2005)

Discography

Singles

Clients
The following artists and producers were signed to Violator Management.

50 Cent 
Busta Rhymes
Charles Hamilton
Diddy
N.O.R.E.
Papoose
Prodigy
Q-Tip
Red Alert
Saigon
Uncle Murda
Winky Wright
Bobby Shmurda
Missy Elliott
LL Cool J

Former artists
The following artists were signed to Violator Records

Fat Joe (Violator/Relativity)
Frankie Cutlass (Violator/Relativity)
Cormega (Violator/Def Jam)
Warren G (Violator/Def Jam)
Foxy Brown (Violator/Def Jam)
Da Franchise (Violator/Def Jam)
The Beatnuts (Violator/Relativity)
JoJo Pellegrino (Violator/Loud)
Chi-Ali (Violator/Relativity)

Compilation albums
 Violator: The Album (Violator/Def Jam, 1999)
 Violator: The Album, V2.0 (Violator/Loud/Columbia, 2001)
 V3: The Good, the Bad & the Ugly (unreleased, 2003)

References

External links
Official site
Violator Management Myspace - Violator Management Myspace Page.
 Interview with Chris Lighty

Talent and literary agencies
American record labels
Contemporary R&B record labels
Hip hop record labels
Record labels established in 1998
Mass media companies established in 1998
Entertainment companies of the United States
Sports management companies
Zomba Group of Companies subsidiaries